Lambda Eridani (λ Eri) is a star in the constellation Eridanus. It is visible to the naked eye on a dark night with an apparent visual magnitude of 4.27. The distance to this star, based upon an annual parallax shift of 0.00402 arcseconds, is roughly 810 light years.

λ Eri is classified in the General Catalogue of Variable Stars as a Beta Cephei variable. The AAVSO International Variable Star Index defines a LERI type of variation. λ Eri is classified as LERI + GCAS since it shows both short term periodic variations and longer timescale eruptive variation. It was one of the first stars where short-period variations were found. The line profile variability periods are 0.702d and 0.269d, with intermittently present periods of 0.6d and 0.75d. The photometric amplitude of the variation is 0.010 magnitude.

This is a giant or subgiant Be star with a stellar classification of B2 IVne or B2 III(e)p, depending on the source. It is spinning rapidly with a projected rotational velocity of 327 km/s. Compare this to the estimated break-up velocity of 440 km/s. This rotation is giving the star an oblate shape with an equatorial bulge that is 25% larger than the polar radius. The most likely rotation period is deemed to be twice the period of variation, or 1.4 days. The star also possesses a rotating circumstellar disc, seen edge on, which makes Lambda Eri a "shell star", where the disk appears more opaque than usual. 

Like most Be stars, Lambda Eridani emits soft X-rays. In 1993, a giant X-ray flare was observed in which the X-ray luminosity increased by a factor of six over a 39-hour period. Lambda Eridani has about nine times the mass of the Sun, and seven times the Sun's radius.

References

B-type subgiants
Be stars
Eridanus (constellation)
Lambda Eridani variables
Eridani, Lambda
Eridani, 69
033328
023972
01679
Durchmusterung objects